Wigginton (Wigentone - 1086) is a large village and civil parish running north–south and perched at  on the edge of the Chiltern Hills and aside the border with Buckinghamshire. It is part of  Dacorum district in the county of Hertfordshire.  The nearest towns are Tring in Hertfordshire (1.5m NW) and across the other side of the A41, Chesham (6m S) and Wendover (6m W), both in Buckinghamshire. Adjacent to the main village is the settlement of Wigginton Bottom where a number of farmworkers cottages were built during the 19th century.

History
There is evidence of prehistoric settlement, possibly dating from the Iron Age, in the form of Grim's Ditch, with a short length of the Chilterns Hills section remaining just south of the village settlement.

In the 11th century, Wigginton was under the control of a half-brother of William I, Robert, Count of Mortain. However, in 1086 the Domesday Book indicated that Wigginton had not been gifted to him but was probably acquired by force by Robert from two adjacent estates close to Tring, one of which had previously been in the hands of Edith of Wessex. During the 13th century Wigginton formed part of the estate at Little Gaddesden passing first to the de Broc family and then, through marriage to the de Lucys. After the death of Sir William Lucy in 1466 it was in the ownership of the Corbets for over 130 years. The manor was then the subject of successive legal challenges fought out in the Court of Chancery until it came into the possession of Sir Richard Anderson of the manor of Pendley during the 1650s. Elizabeth Spencer (née Anderson) inherited Wigginton and became the third wife of Simon Harcourt, 1st Viscount Harcourt 1703. The manor remained in the Harcourt family until the 1860s. Colonel Charles Harcourt had died in 1831 leaving the manor to his three daughters, Sarah, Elizabeth and Alice who jointly sold it to Rev. James Williams in 1868. Wigginton Common was enclosed in 1854 and was subsequently incorporated into the Tring Park Estate owned at the time by the Rothschild Family.

The Champneys (also recorded as Champneys and Forsters) estate was originally a separate manor associated with Tring and was recorded in the Court Rolls of 1514. It was owned by successive landowning families in the Wigginton and surrounding area between the 14th and 19th centuries, although for a short period around 1535 it is recorded as owned by Thomas Cranmer, the then Archbishop of Canterbury. In 1902 Champneys was sold to Lady Rothschild by the Rev. Arthur Sutton Valpy, a descendant of Richard Valpy who had inherited it in 1871. Stanley Lief (1890 — 1962) converted the stately home of Champneys into a Nature Cure sanatorium which he ran from the 1930s for about 20 years. It is currently a health spa.

Religion
St Bartholomews Church, built of flint and stone, was first recorded in 1217 and is thought to have had connections with the Knights Hospitalers. Much of the main building dates from the 15th century and major restoration was undertaken in 1881.  There is evidence of Nonconformist worship during the 18th century a Baptist chapel was only opened in the village in 1904.

Education
Primary school education is provided by St Bartholomews Church of England Primary School.

Notable people
James Osborne (13 April 1857 – 1 February 1928) a resident of Wigginton was awarded the Victoria Cross for his valour on 22 February 1881 during the Boer Wars at Wesselstroom, South Africa. Notice of his VC was published in the London Gazette in March 1882.

References

External links
History Online - Victoria History of the County of Hertford: volume 2 (1908), pp. 314-17 - Wigginton

Wigginton Village Website

Villages in Hertfordshire
Dacorum
Civil parishes in Hertfordshire